Acrotrichis insularis is a species of feather-winged beetle.

Distribution
In New Zealand, the species is exotic and present in the wild.

References

External links

 Images and DNA barcode information

Beetles described in 1852
Terrestrial biota of New Zealand
Beetles of New Zealand